Ghosts and Grisly Things is a collection of horror stories by British writer Ramsey Campbell, first published by Pumpkin Books in 1998. It contains an introduction by the author.

Contents
The book contains the following stories:

 "The Same in Any Language" (1991)
 "Going Under" (1995)
 "The Alternative" (1994)
 "Out of the Woods" (1996)
 "A Street Was Chosen" (1991)
 "McGonagall in the Head" (1992)
 "Through the Walls" (1985)
 "This Time" (1986)
 "The Sneering" (1985)
 "Between the Floors" (1997)
 "Where They Lived" (1994)
 "Root Cause" (1986)
 "Looking Out" (1986)
 "The Dead Must Die" (1992)
 "A Side of the Sea" (1994)
 "Missed Connection" (1976)
 "The Change" (1980)
 "Welcomeland" (1988)
 "See How They Run" (1993)
 "Ra*e" (1998)

1998 short story collections
Fantasy short story collections
Horror short story collections